The T1 League is a Taiwanese men's professional basketball league founded in 2021. The league is composed of six teams. It is the third professional basketball league after the now-defunct Chinese Basketball Alliance (CBA; 1994–1999) and P. League+ (PLG; founded in 2020) in Taiwan.

History

2021 

On May 10, 2021, Kuan Kuang-Chung, the former National Basketball Association (NBA) Taiwan region general manager, served as the sponsor of the new professional basketball league. And there were four corporations willing to join the league. On May 24, the name of the new league was announced as T1 League. There were four teams came from Kaohsiung City, New Taipei City, Taichung City, and Taipei City applied to join the league. On May 26, the Kaohsiung Aquas announced to join the T1 League. On June 19, the Taichung Suns was established formally. On July 30, the New Taipei CTBC DEA was established formally to be the new team of the T1 League.

On August 6, the T1 League announced that Chien Wei-Chuan was the commissioner of the league. Besides, the Taoyuan Leopards and the Tainan team would join the league. On August 9, the T1 League held the first draft. There were 58 players participated in the draft, and 17 players were chosen in 5 rounds. On September 2, the Taiwan Beer basketball team announced to join the league as the TaiwanBeer HeroBears. On September 6, the T1 League announced that Chang Yun-Chih was the secretary general of the league. On September 30, the name of Tainan team was announced as the Tainan TSG GhostHawks. On November 25, the Taichung Suns changed the name to the Taichung Wagor Suns. On November 27, the 2021–22 season opening game, matched by Kaohsiung Aquas and TaiwanBeer HeroBears, was played at University of Taipei Tianmu Campus Gymnasium.

2022 
On June 4, 2022, the Kaohsiung Aquas defeated the Taichung Wagor Suns, 3–0, winning the 2021–22 season championship. On July 12, the T1 League held the second draft. There were 44 players participated in the draft, and 14 players were chosen in 3 rounds. On September 5, the T1 League announced that Liu Yi-Cheng served as the vice commissioner of the league. Hsieh Chih-Cheng was the new chief operating officer, and Chang Shu-Jen, the general manager of the New Taipei CTBC DEA, was the new secretary general of the league. The former secretary general and chief operating officer, Chang Yun-Chih and Chia Fan, would transfer to senior consultant and tournament consultant, respectively. On September 29, the T1 League announced that Tsai Shang-Hua served as the strategic marketing director of the league. On October 29, the 2022–23 season opening game, matched by Kaohsiung Aquas and New Taipei CTBC DEA, was played at Xinzhuang Gymnasium.

2023 
On February 28, 2023, the T1 League held the first All-Star Game at Taipei Heping Basketball Gymnasium.

Teams

Rules and regulations

Games 
Each quarter plays 12 minutes. Each game totally plays 48 minutes.

Players 
 Each team can select 12 or 13 players to active roster in each match.
 Each team is able to register 9 to 14 local players, 2 or 3 general import players and 1 type-III player.
 Each team is able to select 2 to 3 import players (including at least 1 type-III player) into active roster in each match.
 8-Imports-In-4-Quarters Rule : each quarter can have 2 import players or 1 import player and 1 type-III player on the court.
 Type-III player eligibility:
 (1) Naturalized players
 (2) Asian import players
 (3) Foreign students
 (4) Overseas compatriots
 Since December 31, 2022, each team is able to register 3 or 4 general import players, and the T1 League cancelled type-III player.

Regular season 
Each team plays against another six times, three at home and three on the road, respectively. Each team plays 30 matches total in the regular season.

Ranking

Playoffs

Play-in 
The fourth and fifth seeds play the best-of-three play-in series. The fourth seed is awarded a one-win advantage. The winner can qualify the semifinals series.

Semifinals 
The winner of play-in series and the top three seeds play the best-of-five semifinals series. Due to the COVID-19 pandemic in Taiwan, the 2022 semifinals series changed to best-of-three series.

Finals 
The winners of the semifinals series play the best-of-seven finals series. Due to the COVID-19 pandemic in Taiwan, the 2022 finals series changed to best-of-five series.

All-Star Game

Broadcast partners

Mottos

See also
Chinese Basketball Alliance (CBA)
Chinese Taipei men's national basketball team
List of basketball leagues
P. League+ (PLG)
Sport in Taiwan
Super Basketball League (SBL)
Women's Super Basketball League (WSBL)

Note

References

External links 

 
Professional sports leagues in Taiwan
Basketball leagues in Taiwan
2021 establishments in Taiwan
Sports leagues established in 2021